Empress Xiaoliewu (1590 – 1 October 1626), of the Manchu Plain White Banner Ula Nara clan, personal name Abahai, was a consort of Nurhaci. She was 31 years his junior.

Abahai was erroneously identified with Hong Taiji, Nurhaci's eighth son and successor, in earlier sources.

Life

Family background
 Father: Mantai (d. 1596), held the title of a third rank prince
 Paternal grandfather: Bugan, held the title of a third rank prince
 Paternal uncle: Bujantai (1575–1618), held the title of a third rank prince

Wanli era
In November or December 1601, Lady Ula Nara married Nurhaci, becoming one of his multiple wives. Following the death of Empress Xiaocigao on 31 October 1603, Lady Ula Nara was elevated to Nurhaci's primary consort. She gave birth on 28 August 1605 to Nurhaci's 12th son, Ajige, on 17 November 1612 to his 14th son, Dorgon, and on 2 April 1614 to his 15th son, Dodo.

Tiancong era
Lady Ula Nara was forced to commit suicide on 1 October 1626 by her stepsons (including Hong Taiji) because they feared that she might be a barrier to Hong Taiji's succession.

Shunzhi era
During the early reign of the Shunzhi Emperor, Dorgon served as Prince-Regent for the underage emperor. In 1650, Lady Ula Nara was posthumously elevated to "Empress Xiaoliewu". In 1653, the Shunzhi Emperor revoked Lady Ula Nara's posthumous title.

Titles
 During the reign of the Wanli Emperor (r. 1572–1620):
 Lady Ula Nara (from 1590)
 Secondary consort (from November/December 1601)
 Primary consort (from 1603)
 During the reign of the Shunzhi Emperor (r. 1643–1661):
 Empress Xiaoliewu (from 1650–1653)

Issue
 As primary consort:
 Ajige (28 August 1605 – 28 November 1651), Nurhaci's 12th son, granted the title Prince Wuying of the Second Rank in 1636, elevated to Prince Ying of the First Rank in 1644
 Dorgon (17 November 1612 – 31 December 1650), Nurhaci's 14th son, granted the title Prince Rui of the First Rank in 1636, posthumously honoured as Prince Ruizhong of the First Rank
 Dodo (2 April 1614 – 29 April 1649), Nurhaci's 15th son, granted the title Prince Yu of the First Rank in 1636, posthumously honoured as Prince Yutong of the First Rank

In fiction and popular culture
 Portrayed by Eva Lai in The Rise and Fall of Qing Dynasty (1987)
 Portrayed by Siqin Gaowa in Xiaozhuang Mishi (2003)
 Portrayed by Cheng Lisha in Taizu Mishi (2005)
 Portrayed by Tao Huimin in Da Qing Fengyun (2006)
 Portrayed by Kara Hui in The Legend of Xiaozhuang (2015)
 Portrayed by Chen Xinyu in Rule the World (2017)

See also
 Imperial Chinese Harem system#Qing
 Royal and noble ranks of the Qing dynasty

Notes

References
 
 

1590 births
1626 deaths
Qing dynasty posthumous empresses
Manchu people
Suicides in China
16th-century Chinese women
16th-century Chinese people
17th-century Chinese women
17th-century Chinese people
17th-century suicides
Forced suicides of Chinese people
Ulanara clan
Jurchens in Ming dynasty
People from Jilin City